Khisa or Kisa is a village in Kgalagadi District of Botswana. It is located close to the border with South Africa, north-east of the district capital Tshabong. The population was 383 in 2011 census.

References

Kgalagadi District
Villages in Botswana